Jan Apell and Jonas Björkman were the defending champions but did not compete that year.

David Ekerot and Jeff Tarango won in the final 6–4, 3–6, 6–4 against Joshua Eagle and Peter Nyborg.

Seeds
Champion seeds are indicated in bold text while text in italics indicates the round in which those seeds were eliminated.

 Tomás Carbonell /  Francisco Roig (semifinals)
 Joshua Eagle /  Peter Nyborg (final)
 David Ekerot /  Jeff Tarango (champions)
 Stefan Edberg /  Anders Järryd (semifinals)

Draw

References
 1996 Swedish Open Doubles draw

Men's Doubles
Doubles
Swedish